Frederick Dunlap may refer to:
 Fred Dunlap (1859–1902), second baseman and manager in Major League Baseball
 Frederick Dunlap (American football) (born 1928), college football coach